Younis Mohammed Ibrahim al-Hayari (1969 – ) was a Moroccan Al-Qaeda member.

Background
During the 1990s, he fought in Bosnia. He was top on Saudi Arabia's list of 36 "most wanted terrorist suspects" published on 28 June 2005. He who was reported killed in a shootout with Saudi Arabian security officials on July 3, 2005. The gunfight took place in Riyadh. At the time of his death, he was described as the head of Al-Qaeda in the Arabian Peninsula.

The Saudi statement says that al-Hayari travelled to Saudi Arabia on Hajj in 2001 and then went underground. He was accused of playing a part in several attacks in the country, in affiliation with fellow Moroccan Karim el-Mejjati, who was killed at Al-Rass a few weeks earlier.

References

1969 births
2005 deaths
Al-Qaeda in the Arabian Peninsula
Bosnian mujahideen
Deaths by firearm in Saudi Arabia
Moroccan al-Qaeda members

Members of al-Qaeda in the Islamic Maghreb